Sebastian Seifert (born 12 December 1978) is a Swedish handballer, currently playing for Danish Handball League side KIF Kolding. He has previously played for German League club TuS Nettelstedt

Seifert has played 92 matches for the Swedish national handball team.

External links
 player info

1978 births
Living people
Swedish male handball players
Swedish expatriate sportspeople in Denmark
Swedish expatriate sportspeople in Germany
Swedish people of German descent